Margarita Gasparyan and Alexandra Panova were the defending champions, but Gasparyan could not participate due to injury. Panova teamed up with Evgeniya Rodina, but they retired in the first round against Demi Schuurs and Renata Voráčová.

Raluca Olaru and İpek Soylu won the title, defeating Schuurs and Voráčová in the final 7–5, 6–3.

Seeds

Draw

Draw

References
Main Draw

Tashkent Open - Doubles
2016 Tashkent Open